Live... One Summer Night is a live album by Paco de Lucía Sextet, the band formed by famous flamenco guitarist Paco de Lucía.

Track listing
 "Palenque" – 8:11
 "Alta mar" – 11:40
 "Sólo quiero caminar” – 9:50
 "Chiquito" – 5:55
 "Gitanos Andaluces" – 5:28

Musicians
 Paco de Lucía - Flamenco guitar
 Ramón de Algeciras - Flamenco guitar
 Carles Benavent - Bass guitar
 Pepe de Lucía - Vocals, Rhythm guitar
 Jorge Pardo - Flute, Soprano saxophone
 Rubem Dantas - Percussion

References
 Gamboa, Manuel José and Nuñez, Faustino. (2003). Paco de Lucía. Madrid:Universal Music Spain.

Paco de Lucía live albums
1984 live albums

1. Palenque 8:11
2. Alta Mar 11:40
3. Solo Quiero Caminar 9:50
4. Chiquito 5:55
5. Gitanos Andaluces 5:28